"Give Me the Reason" is a song by American recording artist Luther Vandross, issued as the first single from the album of the same name (1986). The single was a top five hit on Billboards Hot Black Singles chart.  It was also a #57 pop hit on Billboard's Hot 100 Charts.

Critical reception
In her review of "Give Me the Reason", Karen Swayne from Number One wrote that "it's one of the most seductive sounds you'll ever hear, featuring a voice like melted chocolate caressing a melody so sexy you'll think all your Valentine's Days have come at once."

Music video
The single's music video was directed by Andy Morahan. It features Vandross behind a greenscreen, putting himself in certain scenes of the movie Ruthless People.

Charts

References

1986 songs
1986 singles
Epic Records singles
Luther Vandross songs
Music videos directed by Andy Morahan
Song recordings produced by Marcus Miller
Songs written by Luther Vandross
Songs written by Nat Adderley Jr.